The 2007 Indian Wells Masters (also known as the Pacific Life Open for sponsorship reasons) was a tennis tournament played on Hard courts. It was the 34th edition of the Indian Wells Masters and was part of the ATP Masters Series of the 2007 ATP Tour. Both the men's and the women's events took place at the Indian Wells Tennis Garden in Indian Wells, California, United States, from March 5 through March 18, 2007.

Review
The tournament was the first Masters Series event on the 2007 ATP Tour, and saw Rafael Nadal win his first tournament of the year. Roger Federer lost unexpectedly in the second round to lucky loser Guillermo Cañas, who only returned to the circuit six months earlier after a ban for doping offences. Federer, on a 41-match unbeaten streak, was unable to break Guillermo Vilas' record of 46 straight victories. Novak Djokovic managed to make his first impression in a major tournament, reaching the final.

The women's side saw Daniela Hantuchová win the second tournament of her career, her first also coming at Indian Wells five years previously in 2002.

Champions

Men's singles

 Rafael Nadal defeated  Novak Djokovic 6–2, 7–5
It was Rafael Nadal's 1st title of the year and his 18th overall. It was his 1st Masters title of the year and his 7th overall.

Women's singles

 Daniela Hantuchová defeated  Svetlana Kuznetsova 6–3, 6–4
It was Daniela Hantuchová's 1st title of the year and her 2nd overall. It was her 1st Tier I title of the year and her 2nd overall. It was her second title at the event, also winning in 2002.

Men's doubles

 Martin Damm /  Leander Paes defeated  Jonathan Erlich /  Andy Ram 6–4, 6–4

Women's doubles

 Lisa Raymond /  Samantha Stosur defeated  Chan Yung-jan /  Chuang Chia-jung 6–3, 7–5

References

External links

Association of Tennis Professionals (ATP) tournament profile

 
Pacific Life Open
Pacific Life Open
Indian Wells Masters
2007 in American tennis
Indian